San Luis is a municipality and town in the Pinar del Río Province of Cuba. It is centered mainly on agriculture (tobacco, rice, fruit crops), stock raising.

History
It was founded in 1827, and established as a municipality in 1879, when it split from San Juan y Martínez. Until 1977, its territory included the seaport village of La Coloma, currently part of Pinar del Río.

Geography
The municipality is located west of Pinar del Río and includes the villages of Barbacoa, Barrigonas, Buenavista, El Corojo, El Retiro, Llanadas, Palizada, Santa María and Tirado.

Demographics
In 2004, the municipality of San Luis had a population of 34,085.

See also
Municipalities of Cuba
List of cities in Cuba
San Luis Municipal Museum

References

External links
 

Populated places in Pinar del Río Province
Populated places established in 1827
1827 establishments in the Spanish Empire